George Venable Allen (November 3, 1903 – July 11, 1970) was a United States diplomat. He served as ambassador to Iran during the crisis of 1946 and was involved in managing US relations amid the Cold War with the Soviet Union. He was involved in expanding activities of the Voice of America, exporting culture and increasing US participation in the UNESCO.

Biography
Born in Durham, North Carolina, son of a merchant Thomas Ellis Allen and Harriet Moore, he attended Duke University—then known as Trinity College—graduating in 1924 and from Harvard University in 1929.  He worked briefly as a high school teacher between 1924 and 1928 and as a newspaper reporter for the Asheville Times and Durham Herald. 

He joined the Foreign Service in 1930 working first as vice consul in Kingston, Jamaica and later in Shanghai, China, Patras, Greece and Cairo, Egypt. He served as U.S. Ambassador to Iran from 1946 to 1948. During this period he worked on preventing a Soviet Iran oil agreement and led to the Iranian prime minister Ahmad Qavam dropping communist cabinet members. He also helped build ties with Shah Mohammed Reza Pahlavi, playing weekly tennis matches with the monarch. He served as Assistant Secretary of State for Public Affairs from 1948 to 1949, U.S. Ambassador to Yugoslavia from 1949 to 1953, United States Ambassador to India and Nepal 1953–1954.  While in India he along with Dwight D. Eisenhower supported India's rival Pakistan with military support as a deterrent against Soviet relations with India. He then served as Assistant Secretary of State for Near Eastern, South Asian, and African Affairs from 1953 to 1954, U.S. Ambassador to Greece 1956–1957, and Director of the U.S. Information Agency from 1957 to 1960.

Later years
Allen was president of the Tobacco Institute from 1960 to 1966. 

Allen appeared as himself, while serving as the Director of the Foreign Service Institute, on the February 6, 1967 episode of the game show To Tell the Truth. He deceived none, receiving all four votes from the panel.

Family
He married Katherine Martin in 1934, author of a self-published book on their lives overseas, Foreign Service Diary. They had three children, George V. Allen, Jr., John M. Allen and Richard A. Allen, all lawyers in Washington, D.C. He died at Bahama, North Carolina and is interred in Rock Creek Cemetery in Washington D.C.

Notes

External links
 George V. Allen Papers

Duke University Trinity College of Arts and Sciences alumni
Harvard University alumni
People from Durham, North Carolina
1903 births
1970 deaths
Ambassadors of the United States to Greece
Ambassadors of the United States to India
Ambassadors of the United States to Iran
Ambassadors of the United States to Nepal
United States Information Agency directors
Ambassadors of the United States to Yugoslavia
20th-century American diplomats
United States Career Ambassadors
United States Assistant Secretaries of State
Assistant Secretaries of State for African Affairs